Dixon's ground snake (Erythrolamprus atraventer) is a species of snake in the family Colubridae. The species is endemic to Southeastern Brazil.

Geographic range
E. atraventer is found in the Brazilian states of Rio de Janeiro and São Paulo.

Habitat
E. atraventer occurs in the upland areas of the Atlantic Forest, forest edges, in wet areas, and in both forested and open areas. It is terrestrial and diurnal.

Description
The holotype, a male, measures  in total length, which includes  tail. Female topotypes had relatively shorter tails. The belly is black, as indicated by its specific name (from Latin atra (=black) and venter (=belly)).

Reproduction
E. atraventer is oviparous.

Conservation status
The IUCN did not identify any overt threats affecting E. atraventer, and lists the species as "Least Concern". It is locally common, e.g., in the Serra do Mar State Park.

References

Reptiles of Brazil
Erythrolamprus
Snakes of South America
Endemic fauna of Brazil
Reptiles described in 1985
Taxa named by James R. Dixon
Taxonomy articles created by Polbot